Joseph Augustine Clarke (1844–1890) early Queensland artist, painter, journal illustrator and arts-teacher.

'J.A. Clark', as he commonly signed himself, was responsible for the famous 1880 oil painting 'Panorama of Brisbane from Bowen Terrace' and also for all of the famous front pages and title-illustration used in the Queenslander (see illustration on this page) during Lukin's managing editorship of that Journal from 1873 to 1880.

Little is known about Clark, except that he was born in England as son of John Clark and Mary Shell and that he came to Brisbane from India about 1870. He was trained at the Department of Science and Art, South Kensington, and had taught at the Bombay School of Design before coming to the colony of Queensland. In Queensland he became a leading artist, art critic and art teacher, a member of the Board of General Education (the predecessor of the Department of Public Instruction) and, in 1872, the North Brisbane School of Arts.

It is said that his original migration from England was caused by a 'weak chest' (likely TB). He was certainly a treasured teacher on Brisbane's School of Art, later a 'Drawing Master' at Brisbane Girls Grammar School, next to his work as a painter and as an illustrator (most notably for The Queenslander, and for 'Bobby' Byrne's weekly the Queensland Figaro).

References

 Clarke, Eddie & Logan, Greg. "Technical edudation". In "The chronology of Education in Queensland". Queensland. Department of Education, 1982. https://education.qld.gov.au/about/history/Documents/technical-education.pdf
 de Vries, Susanna and Jake de Vries: "Historic Brisbane. Convict Settlement to River City". Brisbane, ii19 pages illustrated p p77.
 Evans, Susanna: "Historic Brisbane and its Early Artists", Ascot, Brisbane 1882, 119 pages illustrated pp 66–71.
 McKay, Judith. "J.A. Clarke's 'grand picture' of Brisbane". Australiana, vol.10, no.4, November 1988, pp. 119–121.
 McKay, Judith. "JA CLARKE’S ‘GRAND PICTURE’ OF BRISBANE". QAGOMA Blog, 12 March 2021. https://blog.qagoma.qld.gov.au/j-a-clarkes-grand-picture-of-brisbane-australia/
 Queensland Art Gallery | Gallery of Modern Art (QAGOMA). "J.A. Clarke Panorama of Brisbane 1880". QAGOMA Learning [online] https://learning.qagoma.qld.gov.au/artworks/panorama-of-brisbane/
 Sherwood, Cathie. The story behind a photograph. Genealogical Society of Queensland Inc, 1 April 2019. https://gsq-blog.gsq.org.au/the-story-behind-a-photograph/

19th-century Australian artists
1844 births
1890 deaths
Artists from Brisbane
Artists from Queensland